ʻAna Kilistina Poʻuhila (born October 18, 1979 in Longoteme, Tongatapu, Tonga) is a Tongan athlete.

Biography
She represented the Kingdom of Tonga in the shot put event during the 2008 Summer Olympics in Beijing. She had the honour of being the flagbearer for her country at the opening ceremony. Originally a sprinter, she is now known for breaking the national Tongan shot put record in 2008 during her European Olympic preparation tour with a put of 18.03 metres in Albertville.

As she threw over the Olympic qualifying distance of 17.20 metres ten times she qualified for the 2008 Olympics on merit. However, she did not advance beyond the qualification round as her put of 16.42 metres placed her in only the 27th position. She had previously competed in the 2004 Summer Olympics for the event of shot put, but her throw of 15.33 metres did not allow her to qualify for the final round.

On July 2, 2009, she broke the Tongan national record in hammer throwing, with a throw of 53,53m.

She placed 14th in the shot put qualifier of the 2012 Summer Olympics with a put of 15.80 m.

Personal best

Achievements

Honours
National honours
  Order of Queen Sālote Tupou III, Member (31 July 2008).

References

External links
 
 
 Let The Games Begin at HPTC Oceania
 Biography on the official website of the Beijing Olympics

1979 births
Living people
Tongan female shot putters
Athletes (track and field) at the 2004 Summer Olympics
Athletes (track and field) at the 2008 Summer Olympics
Athletes (track and field) at the 2012 Summer Olympics
Olympic athletes of Tonga
People from Tongatapu
Female hammer throwers
Tongan female discus throwers
Members of the Order of Queen Sālote Tupou III